Victoria Square is located in central Christchurch, New Zealand. Originally known as Market Place or Market Square, it was the site of market days, fairs, and trade before its redevelopment in 1896–1897 into a park. Subsequent to the February 2011 earthquake, the square was located in the Central City Red Zone and was closed, reopening in November 2012. Its notable landmarks include the Captain James Cook statue, Queen Victoria statue, H. L. Bowker Fountain, and the Victoria Square Poupou. It also features the country's oldest cast iron and stone bridge, now known as the Hamish Hay Bridge.

Geography

Victoria Square is one of four squares located in the Christchurch Central City. It is located just north-west from its centre, Cathedral Square. Colombo Street is the north-south street through Cathedral Square, and it forms the eastern boundary of Victoria Square. Armagh Street bounds the square on the southern side. The Avon River diagonally bisects the square. In the early days, Oxford and Cambridge Terraces ran alongside the river, but those streets now stop short of Victoria Square. The square was initially bisected by Whately Road (named after the Archbishop of Dublin, Richard Whately, who was a member of the Canterbury Association.), later renamed Victoria Street, and this formed a major route to the north towards Papanui and beyond. Other boundary streets are Kilmore and Durham Streets on the northern and western boundaries, respectively. Victoria Street was stopped in 1988 under much public protest when the Parkroyal Hotel, the later Crowne Plaza, was built. When the Crowne Plaza was demolished in 2011/12 following the earthquakes, some were calling for the road to be restored; this included central city business leader Paul Lonsdale. This caused quite a storm of opposition, and soon after, the idea of restoring the road was dropped.

History
Between 1000 and 1500, the area belonged to Puari, a settlement of the Waitaha people, an early Māori iwi (tribe or nation); it is thought that at its peak, the settlement or pā accommodated about 800 people. Later, the Ngāi Tahu iwi used the area along the river for food gathering purposes (mahinga kai), but did not settle here.

Christchurch was surveyed by Joseph Thomas and Edward Jollie in March 1850 and whilst the layout envisaged Cathedral Square as the centre of the new city, for the next few decades, Market Place was the economic centre of Christchurch. Important facilities were established there, including the first post office, the police station, a primitive lock-up for criminals, work stores, immigration barracks, and a market hall. George Gould, the father of the prominent businessman and long-time director of The Press of the same name, had his general store on Colombo Street facing Market Square.

The first simple bridge over the Avon River in the square was built in March 1852; it was variably known as Papanui Bridge and Market Place Bridge. It was replaced in September 1864 with a permanent structure and renamed Victoria Bridge. In October 1877, Gould senior presented a petition to the city council to have Whately Road renamed to Victoria Street, which was acceded to.

During an 1852 visit to Christchurch of the Governor, George Grey, it was agreed that the government would pay for a lock-up. Isaac Luck built the structure on the corner of Armagh Street and Cambridge Terrace, which measured only , and which was built by June of that year. What was long talked about afterwards was that upon completion, Luck held a ball in it for his friends.

A town planner, professor Gordon Stephenson, proposed to close Victoria Street through the square. The Christchurch Town Hall was built north of the Avon River along the Kilmore Street frontage. It was designed by Sir Miles Warren and Maurice Mahoney of Warren and Mahoney Architects as part of an architectural competition in 1966. The plans included new civic offices, to be placed adjacent to the town hall on the corner of Kilmore and Durham Street, as the Christchurch City Council had outgrown its existing premises. The town hall was opened in 1972 by the Governor-General Denis Blundell, but the civic offices were not built. The city council instead purchased Miller's Department Store in Tuam Street and moved there in 1980; this proved to be much cheaper than building new premises. The Town Hall was badly damaged in the February 2011 earthquake, and its fate is unclear. In August 2013, council staff presented four options to city councillors that would all retain the building, at a cost of around NZ$125m.

The land initially earmarked for the civic offices was instead leased to a developer, who built a large hotel on the corner. The Parkroyal Hotel was also designed by Warren and Mahoney, and it became one of the finer addresses in Christchurch for accommodation. Majority-owned by Japanese real estate company Daikyo, the hotel was L-shaped, following the two road frontages. On the inside of the corner, a large atrium was formed facing Victoria Square; at the time, it was the largest atrium that had been built in the country. Its name changed to Crowne Plaza after a rebranding by the Bass Hotels and Resorts group in 2001. The Crowne Plaza was heavily damaged in the earthquakes and was demolished in early 2012.

The structure would have been the South Island’s tallest and was to be located the footprint of Victoria St, on the corner of Colombo and Armagh Streets. Local businessman Jamie Tulloch was the public face of the project and the architects for the scheme were once again Warren and Mahoney. Controversial from the start and attracting strong opposition, in April 1988 a commissioners’ report recommended Christchurch City Council oppose the zoning changes required for the project to take place and the project was cancelled.

In late 2012, the Crowne Plaza site was used by the urban regeneration initiative Gap Filler for their Pallet Pavilion, an outdoor venue built by volunteer labour from wooden pallets. Originally envisaged to be there for just the summer of 2012/13, the venue proved so popular that crowdfunding raised $80,000 for night time security, maintenance and a venue manager over the 2013 winter.

Victoria Square was one of the few places in the central city not devastated by the 2011 Christchurch earthquake. When the Christchurch Central Development Unit released plans in 2014 for a NZ$7–8 million remodelling as part of the Avon River precinct upgrade, a huge public outcry was the result. Government's announcement was not consultation, but was issued for information, and the resulting calls for a consultation exercise were initially denied. In February 2015, the project was put on hold and a public consultation period started. In July 2015, draft plans were released for some restoration work that will see Victoria Square largely unchanged.

In November 2014, Adjunct Professor of History, Geoffrey Rice, published a book on Victoria Square.

Description
Its notable landmarks include the Captain James Cook statue, the statue of Queen Victoria, H. L. Bowker Fountain, and the Victoria Square Poupou.

Registered heritage places
Victoria Square has a large number of buildings, structures, and statues either adjoining or within it that are registered as heritage items with the New Zealand Historic Places Trust. Many of those were damaged in the February 2011 earthquake.

Bibliography

Notes

References

External links

Squares in Christchurch
Buildings and structures in Christchurch
Monuments and memorials to Queen Victoria